Michael Jackson The One is the DVD release of a CBS special that aired in January 2004. Released by Epic Records, it includes interviews with other celebrities about Jackson's influence on music and pop culture, and also contains clips from Jackson's previous music videos. It was certified Gold in the US five months after release, with shipments amassing 50,000 units by that point. The certification body of the US—the RIAA—recognizes the DVD as an official Michael Jackson production. It was also released on Video CD format, in several Asian countries such as India and Thailand.

Track listings

Includes short concert footage of
"I Want You Back"
"Billie Jean"
"Wanna Be Startin' Somethin'"
"Rock With You"
"Don't Stop 'Til You Get Enough"
"You Rock My World"
"Thriller"
"We Are the World"
"One More Chance"
"Black or White"
"Another Part of Me"
"Workin' Day and Night"
"Smooth Criminal"
"They Don't Care About Us"
"Blood on the Dance Floor"
"Beat It"
"Man in the Mirror" (live from the Bad World Tour)

Certifications

References

2004 video albums
Michael Jackson video albums